Identity documents of India are increasingly used to transact and obtain government benefits in India.

While there is no single mandatory document, the following documents are used in lieu of a national identity document:

List of Identity documents of India
 Aadhaar Card, issued by UIDAI.
 Voter ID Card issued by the Election Commission of India
 Indian passport
 ABHA Card issued by the Election Commission of India
 Overseas Citizenship of India document
 Person of Indian Origin Card
 PAN Card, issued by the Income Tax Department
 Driving license in India issued by the respective state governments
 Ration card issued by the Government of India
 Identity Certificate for non-citizens or stateless people
 A Birth certificate issued by the Registry of Births and Deaths (RBD) or from a Municipality within the provisions of the RBD Act
 Transfer/School leaving/Matriculation Certificate
 Service Identity Card issued by State/Central Government, Public Sector Undertakings, local bodies or public Limited Companies
 Copy of an extract of the service record of the applicant (only in respect of Government servants) or the Pay Pension Order (in respect of retired Government Servants), duly attested/certified by the officer/in-charge of the Administration of the concerned Ministry/Department of the holder
 Policy Bond issued by Public Life Insurance Corporations/Companies
 Scheduled Caste/Scheduled Tribe/Other Backward Classes Certificates
 Freedom Fighter Identity Cards
 Arms Licenses
 Property Documents such as Pattas, Registered Deeds etc.
 Railway Identity Cards
 Student Photo Identity Cards issued by Government Recognized Educational Institutions in respect of full time courses
 Gas Connection Bill
 Bank/ Kisan/ Post Office Passbooks
 Photo Bank ATM Card
 Photo Credit Card
 Pensioner Photo Card
 Certificate of Identify having photo issued by Gazetted Officer or Tehsildar on letterhead
 Unique Disability ID (UDID) Card / Disability medical certificate issued by the respective State / UT
 Marriage Certificate
 Proof of Marriage document issued by the Registrar
 Gazette Notification
 Legal Name Change Certificate
 Land revenue certificate
 Land Certificate
Identity documents are used for multiple purposes:
 For domestic and international travel
 To obtain a mobile phone SIM card
 To apply for a passport
 To obtain government benefits
 In certain cases when asked to do so by law-enforcement officers

Issues
A large number of people remain without identity documents - poor people especially. In order to include them, identity requirements for Aadhaar have been reduced, however biometric facilities have been provided to reduce or eliminated duplication, so while it may be possible to obtain the card under a false name, it is less likely to be able to obtain another Aadhaar card under a different (or real) name, though there have been cases where the biometrics has been circumvented.

There was a criticism that India has too many Identity systems, and they are not consistently accepted. As a solution, GOI introduced Aadhaar Cards in 2014, which is most widely accepted identification document in india and can be easily obtained by any person of any age group.

References